Robert Bergen (born 26 February 1950) is a Canadian rower. He competed in the men's coxed pair event at the 1976 Summer Olympics.

References

External links
 

1950 births
Living people
Canadian male rowers
Olympic rowers of Canada
Rowers at the 1976 Summer Olympics
Rowers from Vancouver